Since the death of Alexander Hamilton on July 12, 1804, numerous things have been named after him, including unit lineage, vessels, schools, towns, buildings, public works and art, and geographic sites.

Lineage
 The lineage of the New York Provincial Company of Artillery has been perpetuated in a series of units nicknamed "Hamilton's Own." It was carried by the 5th Field Artillery Regiment.

Vessels

Steamers
 PS Alexander Hamilton was completed in 1924. When she retired from service as a passenger steamboat in 1971, it was one of the last operating sidewheel steamboats in the United States. It was the last sidewheeler to traverse the Hudson River.

United States Coast Guard
 USRC Hamilton (1830), the fastest Morris-Taney-class cutter, was operated out of Boston for much of her career. It became famous for rescues and saving property. A song titled "The Cutter Hamilton Quick step" was written in November 1839. The vessel was lost in a gale in 1853.
 USS Alexander Hamilton (1871) was a revenue cutter in service from 1871 to 1906 and a participant in the Spanish–American War.
 USS Vicksburg (PG-11) was renamed to Alexander Hamilton in 1922 after being transferred to the Coast Guard a year earlier. She was renamed to Beta between 1935 and 1936.
 USCGC Alexander Hamilton was a Treasury-class cutter launched in 1937 and stricken in January 1942 after an attack by Germany. She was the Coast Guard's first loss in World War II.
 USCGC Hamilton (WHEC-715) was a cutter in service from 1967 to 2011 when it was transferred to the Philippine Navy.
 USCGC Hamilton (WMSL-753) is a Legend-class cutter commissioned in 2014.

United States Navy
A number of vessels in the United States Navy have borne the designation USS Hamilton, though some have been named for other men. The USS Alexander Hamilton (SSBN-617) was the second Lafayette-class nuclear-powered fleet ballistic missile submarine.

Houses

 The Hamilton Grange National Memorial is the only house Hamilton owned. The mansion was built on his 32-acre country estate in Hamilton Heights, Manhattan and was completed in 1802. The mansion remained in the family until 1833 when his widow sold it to real estate developer Thomas E. Davis.
 Elizabeth used part of the proceeds from the Grange estate to purchase a new townhouse from Davis, the Hamilton-Holly House. Elizabeth lived in it with her grown children Alexander and Eliza, and their spouses until 1843.

Colleges and universities
 The main classroom building for the humanities at Columbia University is Hamilton Hall. The university's student group for Reserve Officers' Training Corps cadets and Marine officer candidates is named the Alexander Hamilton Society.
 Hamilton served as one of the first trustees of the Hamilton-Oneida Academy, which was renamed to Hamilton College in 1812 after receiving a college charter.
 The main administration building of the United States Coast Guard Academy in New London, Connecticut is named Hamilton Hall to commemorate Hamilton's creation of the United States Revenue Cutter Service, one of the predecessors to the Coast Guard.

Schools

 Alexander Hamilton High School in Los Angeles
 Alexander Hamilton Jr./Sr. High School
 Alexander Hamilton High School in Brooklyn
 Alexander Hamilton High School in Milwaukee

Buildings and public work

 The Salem, Massachusetts social space Hamilton Hall was built in 1805.
 Fort Hamilton, the fourth oldest installation in the United States, was built in 1831.
 Alexander Hamilton Bridge, an eight-lane steel arch bridge that carries traffic over the Harlem River, opened near his former Grange estate on January 15, 1963.
 In 1990, a New York government building was renamed to the Alexander Hamilton U.S. Custom House.
 At Hamilton's birthplace in Charlestown, Nevis, the Alexander Hamilton Museum was rebuilt on the foundations of the house where Hamilton was once believed to have been born and lived during his childhood.

Statues
 In 1880, Hamilton's son John Church Hamilton commissioned Carl Conrads to sculpt a granite statue, now located in Central Park, New York City.
 The Hamilton Club in Brooklyn, New York City commissioned William Ordway Partridge to cast a bronze statue of Hamilton. It was completed in 1892 for exhibition at the World's Columbian Exposition and later installed in front of the club on the corner of Remsen and Clinton Streets in 1893. The club was absorbed by another and the building was demolished; the statue was removed in 1936 to the Hamilton Grange National Memorial in Manhattan. After the memorial relocated in 2007, the statue remained at that location.
 A bronze statue of Hamilton by Franklin Simmons, dated 1905–06, overlooks the Great Falls of the Passaic River at Paterson Great Falls National Historical Park in New Jersey.
 In Washington, D.C., the south terrace of the Treasury Building features a statue of Hamilton by James Earle Fraser, which was dedicated on May 17, 1923.
 In Chicago, a thirteen-foot tall statue of Hamilton by sculptor John Angel was cast in 1939. It was not installed at Lincoln Park until 1952, due to problems with a controversial 78-foot tall columned shelter designed for it and later demolished in 1993. The statue has remained on public display, and was restored and regilded in 2016.
 A bronze sculpture of Hamilton titled The American Cape, by Kristen Visbal, was unveiled at Journal Square in downtown Hamilton, Ohio, in October 2004.

Medals
 Columbia College in New York hands out the Alexander Hamilton Medal as its highest award to accomplished alumni and to those who have offered exceptional service to the school.

Geographic sites

Cities
 Hamilton, Kansas
 Hamilton, Missouri
 Hamilton, Massachusetts
 Hamilton, Ohio

Counties
 Hamilton County, Florida
 Hamilton County, Illinois
 Hamilton County, Indiana
 Hamilton County, Kansas
 Hamilton County, Nebraska
 Hamilton County, New York
 Hamilton County, Ohio
 Hamilton County, Tennessee

References

Alexander Hamilton